Dr Ambedkar Government Arts College is a college based in Vyasarpadi neighbourhood of Chennai district. The college is affiliated to the University of Madras. It was established in the year 1972.

History 
The birth of Dr. Ambedkar Government Arts College could be traced to the aspiring masses, an understanding state and a co-operative community. In the late sixties the clamour for an institution of higher education for the children of North Chennai was steadily increasing. So the Government of Tamilnadu, individual and corporate philanthropists and film stars joined hands with the common people of North Chennai to give a concrete shape to their dreams. Efforts commenced in 1971 when the Government of Tamilnadu located a huge lake lying South of Madras-Calcutta National Highway as the site for the proposed College. The significance of the role this College was going to play in future, is seen in the sharp contrast that marks its arrival from the birth of grandiose institutions. Though land was located, money needed to be raised. Now the Government set up a Fundraising Committee with the Madras District Collector at the helm. The Committee organized Benefit Matches where film-stars wielded the willow for the cause. Company philanthropy and common people together mobilized the Government stipulated sum of ₹5 lakhs (Rupees five lakhs only) and the first brick was laid on clayey soil on 01/08/1972. The then Hon'ble Minister for Harijan Welfare played a noteworthy role consistently. It must be recorded that the same aspirations of the people, which helped found the College in 1973, continue to inspire and guide the teachers and supporting staff of the College to this day.

Undergraduate departments

Science

Physics
Chemistry

Mathematics
Computer Science
Botany
Zoology
Psychology
Nutrition and Dietetics
Statistics
Visual Communication

Arts and Commerce

English
Business Administration
Economics
Commerce
Defence and Strategic Studies

Post-graduate departments 

Chemistry
Mathematics
Computer Science
Zoology
Commerce
Economics
English
Social Work (MSW)
offers two specialisation:

Community Development &Empowerment
Medical & Psychiatry

M.Phil. departments 

Computer Science
Chemistry
Zoology
Commerce
English

Accreditation
The college is  recognized by the University Grants Commission.

Admission 2018-2019 
For the Academic year 2018-2019 Under Graduation admission process starts from 14-05-2018 from this day on wards Sale of Application starts. Sales timing From 10.30 am to 3.00 pm. Counselling starts from 08-06-2018.

See also
Education in India
Literacy in India
B. R. Ambedkar
List of institutions of higher education in Tamil Nadu

References

External links
http://www.daga.co.in/

Educational institutions established in 1973
1973 establishments in Tamil Nadu
Colleges affiliated to University of Madras
Universities and colleges in Chennai